The following were destinations of Livingston Energy Flight, a leisure airline based in Italy (as of April 2009):

Africa
Cape Verde
Boavista - Rabil Airport
Sal - Amílcar Cabral International Airport
Egypt
 Marsa Alam International Airport
 Mersa Matruh Airport
 Sharm el-Sheikh International Airport
Kenya
Mombasa - Moi International Airport
Morocco
 Oujda Airport
Senegal
 Dakar-Yoff-Léopold Sédar Senghor International Airport
Tanzania
 Zanzibar International Airport
Tunisia
 Djerba-Zarzis Airport
Monastir - Monastir International Airport

Americas
Antigua and Barbuda
Antigua - VC Bird International Airport
Barbados
Grantley Adams International Airport
Brazil
Fortaleza - Pinto Martins International Airport
Maceió - Zumbi dos Palmares International Airport
Natal - Augusto Severo International Airport
 Porto Seguro - Porto Seguro Airport
Recife - Guararapes International Airport
Salvador da Bahia - Deputado Luís Eduardo Magalhães International Airport
Cuba
Cayo Largo - Vilo Acuña Airport
Havana - José Martí International Airport
Holguín - Frank País Airport
Colombia
 Cartagena de Indias - Rafael Núñez International Airport
Dominican Republic
 La Romana International Airport
 Punta Cana International Airport
El Salvador
San Salvador - Comalapa International Airport
Jamaica
Montego Bay - Sangster International Airport
Mexico
 Cancún International Airport

Asia
Israel
Tel Aviv - Ben Gurion International Airport [seasonal]
Jordan
Amman - Queen Alia International Airport
Maldives
Male - Malé International Airport
Sri Lanka
Colombo - Bandaranaike International Airport

Europe
France
Lourdes - Tarbes-Lourdes-Pyrénées Airport
Greece
Heraklion - Heraklion International Airport, "Nikos Kazantzakis"
 Karpathos Island National Airport
 Kos Island International Airport
 Mykonos Island National Airport
Rhodes - Rhodes International Airport, "Diagoras"
 Santorini (Thira) National Airport
Italy
 Bari International Airport
 Bologna Airport
 Catania-Fontanarossa Airport
Milan
Malpensa Airport
Orio al Serio Airport
 Naples International Airport
Rome - Leonardo da Vinci Airport
 Verona Airport
Spain
 Fuerteventura Airport
 Ibiza Airport
 Lanzarote Airport
 Málaga Airport
 Menorca Airport
 Palma de Mallorca Airport
Seville - San Pablo Airport
 Tenerife South Airport

References

Lists of airline destinations